"Lord of Our Life and God of Our Salvation" is a German Christian hymn written by Matthäus Apelles von Löwenstern in 1644. It was translated into English in 1840 by Philip Pusey.

History 
The song was written during the Thirty Years' War. Löwenstern wrote it to plead to God for peace. It's based on Psalm 79:9; Revelation 12:10; Psalm 84:11; Matthew 16:18. It was performed by Johann Sebastian Bach. Almost 200 years later, his hymn was discovered by an English parliamentarian Philip Pusey. He found it applicable to the state of the church in England. He found comfort in Löwenstern's prayer and decided o translate it to English and paraphrase it. It was published in Psalm and Hymn Tunes Alexander Robert Reinagle.

Lyrics

References 

1644 works
17th-century hymns in German
German-language songs